Sons of Maxwell is a Canadian music duo who perform both traditional Celtic folk music and original compositions with a pop-folk sound. The duo consists of brothers Don Carroll and Dave Carroll, originally from Timmins, Ontario, residing in Halifax, Nova Scotia since 1994. They began singing together while studying at Carleton University in Ottawa under the band name "The Don and Dave Show" in 1989. One recording was released under that name. They re-christened themselves S.O.M. in 1993, in honour of their father (Max Carroll).

In July 2009 the band became an international media sensation when they released the protest song and music video, "United Breaks Guitars", explaining how, after United Airlines personnel damaged their musical instruments, the airline refused to take responsibility or give compensation for the loss. As a result, in addition to his musical career, Dave Carroll regularly gives speeches about customer service.

Career 
Brothers Don and Dave Carroll began singing together while attending Carleton University in Ottawa. After graduation, they began a full-time professional music career. Sons of Maxwell has toured extensively both in Canada and internationally. The group won an East Coast Music Award in 2006 for the Vibe Marketing Country Recording of the Year with Sunday Morning. The Sons of Maxwell also won an ECMA in 2002 for Roots Traditional Group of the Year with Among The Living. They are 5 time ECMA nominees.

Dave Carroll was named Digital Artist of the Year and Video of the Year at the Nova Scotia Awards in 2009.

United Airlines incident 

The incident, which occurred on March 31, 2008, when the band was flying from Halifax to Omaha, Nebraska on United Airlines, resulted in the damage of a guitar belonging to Dave Carroll. After months of unsuccessful wrangling for reparations, Carroll wrote "United Breaks Guitars" to chronicle the real-life experience of how his guitar was broken and the subsequent stonewalling reaction from the airline. The song became an immediate YouTube and ITMS hit upon its release in July 2009 and a public relations humiliation for United Airlines; The Times reported that four days after the song's release, the company's share price "plunged by 10 per cent, costing shareholders $180 million". A second video, United Breaks Guitars: Song 2 was released on YouTube on August 18, 2009. The song takes a closer look at Dave Carroll's dealings with Ms. Irlweg and targets the flawed policies that she was forced to uphold.  The third song,  "'United We Stand' on the Right Side of Right," was released on March 1, 2010 as a humorous coda to the incident.  In the song, Carroll sings how he is largely satisfied with the resolution of the affair since it has given his career a spectacular boost.  However, he also notes that many people have shared their similar complaints with businesses and they must not be underestimated again.

Carroll now gives public speeches about his experiences and his thoughts about customer service. Furthermore, he has also published a book, United Breaks Guitars: The Power of One Voice in the Age of Social Media. In addition, in April 2017, he was interviewed on Canadian media such as CBC and CTV for a domestic perspective on the United Express Flight 3411 incident where a passenger was forcibly removed from a plane due to overbooking.  Furthermore, Carroll also released a YouTube video detailing his thoughts on the incident and how his third protest song already states his general opinions about United and how they need to change. In this situation, Carroll considers a fourth "United Breaks Guitars" song unnecessary at this time, although he reserves the right to write one if the situation changes enough to warrant it.

Personal life
Aside from their busy music schedule, the Carroll brothers have also served as volunteer firefighters. 
Don Carroll became a career firefighter in 2008.

Discography

The Carroll brothers are also solo artists. 
Dave Carroll has released and toured his album of original work, Perfect Blue, and in 2012 released an album called Raincoat in Vegas.

Don Carroll, featuring his swing band, released a collection of his favourite jazz standards entitled Valentine Delivered in 2008.

In addition, Sons of Maxwell has released the following albums singles and music videos:

Albums and song tracks

Singles

References

External links
Sons of Maxwell Official website
Official Dave Carroll Website

Musical groups established in 1993
Musical groups from Halifax, Nova Scotia
Canadian country music groups
Canadian folk music groups
Canadian folk rock groups
Canadian YouTubers
Canadian YouTube groups